Rajagiri College of Social Sciences is an autonomous higher educational institution located in Kalamassery, Kochi in the Indian state of Kerala.

History
Rajagiri College of Social Sciences was started in 1955 under the University of Madras. In 1960, the college was accredited for offering degrees in Social Services from the University of Kerala and moved to Kalamassery, Kochi.

Academics 
Rajagiri offers Master of Social Work (MSW), Bachelor of Commerce (BCom), Bachelor of Science in Psychology (BScPsy), Bachelor of Business Administration (BBA),  Bachelor of Social Work (BSW), Master of Library Sciences (MLISc), Bachelor of Library Sciences (BLISc) and Master of Computer Applications (MCA) along with research degrees (MPhil/PhD) and diploma programmes. The college is currently, affiliated to the Mahatma Gandhi University.

Rajagiri Centre for Business Studies (RCBS) 
 
Rajagiri Centre for Business Studies is a part of Rajagiri group of institutions, which represents all the management programs offered by Rajagiri Vidyapeetham. RCBS offers courses such as MBA, PGDM, MHRM and International Exchange MBA Programme. In 2018 RCBS was listed under the top 100 Business schools in India by National Institutional Ranking Framework and The Outlook Magazine. RCBS conducts various events and activities throughout the year such as, Rajagiri Management Fest, Rajagiri National Business Quiz (RNBQ), Rajagiri Business League (RBL) and Rajagiri Transcend.

Rankings

Ranked 28th in All India college ranking by National Institutional Ranking Framework in 2020. The Rajagiri Centre for Business Studies was ranked 38th best business school in India by Business Today B-School ranking in 2019.

Notable alumni 
 V. D. Satheesan, Leader of the Opposition in the 15th Kerala Legislative Assembly 
 RJ Renu, Radio Jockey and actress
 Vijayarajamallika, Poet

References

Universities and colleges in Kochi
Educational institutions established in 1955
1955 establishments in Madras State
Arts and Science colleges in Kerala
Colleges affiliated to Mahatma Gandhi University, Kerala
Academic institutions formerly affiliated with the University of Madras